Pär Stenbäck (born 12 August 1941 in Porvoo) is a Finnish politician and debater. Stenbäck was elected to the Finnish parliament at the age of 28 and functioned as the party chairman for the Swedish People's Party 1977–1985. He was Minister of Education and then Foreign Minister in two governments, 1979–1983. This was followed by significant roles within the International Red Cross, International Youth Foundation, the Nordic Council of Ministers, the Swedish Cultural Foundation in Finland and several other organisations.

Career
Stenbäck studied political science at Helsinki University. He worked as a journalist for YLE from 1964 to 1967.

Stenbäck has been a member of the city council of Espoo, and also the Finnish parliament (1970–1985). He was the Minister of Education (1979 to 1982), Minister of Foreign Affairs (1982 to 1983) and Party Leader of the Swedish People's Party (1977 to 1985). He received an Honorary Minister title in 1999.

He has also been the general secretary for the International Federation of the Red Cross and Red Crescent Societies (IFRC) in Geneva from 1988 to 1992. He received the prestigious Henry Dunant Medal of the International Red Cross in 2009. 

Between 1992 and 1997 he functioned as the Secretary General of the Nordic Council of Ministers in Copenhagen. In 1991, he took part in the founding of the International Youth Foundation (IYF), now situated in Baltimore, as a director 1991–1996, thereafter as VP for Europe until 2005. In 1995, he became a founding board member of the International Crisis Group. In 2001, together with ambassador , he founded the European Cultural Parliament, where he is the Chairman of the Senate. In the same year, he founded the Finnish Children and Youth Foundation and acted as its board chair until 2012. In June 2017, he founded the foreign policy association Nya Utrikespolitiska Samfundet.

Publications
Stenbäck has published two books depicting his career in politics and in the Red Cross/Red Crescent movement (2007 and 2009). He is a regular columnist in the daily Hufvudstadsbladet (Helsinki).

 2021,  
 2018,  
 2009,  
 2007,

Awards and recognition
 2009, Henry Dunant Medal, International Red Cross/Red Crescent 
 1999, Honorary Minister title in Finland

References

External links
Personal website

1941 births
Living people
People from Porvoo
Swedish-speaking Finns
Swedish People's Party of Finland politicians
Ministers of Education of Finland
Ministers for Foreign Affairs of Finland
Members of the Parliament of Finland (1970–72)
Members of the Parliament of Finland (1972–75)
Members of the Parliament of Finland (1975–79)
Members of the Parliament of Finland (1979–83)
Members of the Parliament of Finland (1983–87)